The Gradients of Agreement Scale was developed in 1987 by Sam Kaner, Duane Berger, and the staff of Community At Work.

It enables members of a group to express their support for a proposal in degrees, along a continuum. Using this tool, group members are no longer trapped into expressing support in terms of "yes" and "no."

The book "The Facilitator's Guide to Participatory Decision-Making" has been translated into Spanish, French, Russian, Mandarin, Arabic and Swahili, and it has been used in organizations large and small throughout the world.

Links 
 Facilitator's Guide to Participatory Decision-Making
 Team Decision Making: The Gradients of Agreement

Literature 
 Facilitator's Guide to Participatory Decision-Making, 3rd Edition. Sam Kaner. , 432 pages, June 2014, Jossey-Bass

Meetings
Group processes